The 2013 County Championship season, known as the LV= County Championship for sponsorship reasons, was the 114th cricket County Championship season. It was contested through two divisions: Division One and Division Two. Each team played all the others in their division both home and away. Durham were County Champions for the third time in six seasons. The top two teams from Division Two, Lancashire and Northamptonshire, gained promotion to the first division for the 2014 season, while the bottom two sides from Division One—Derbyshire and Surrey—were relegated to Division Two for 2014.

Teams

Division One
 Team promoted from Division Two

Division Two
 Team relegated from Division One

Report

Division One
Defending champions Warwickshire had a disappointing start to the season, only managing a draw against newly promoted Derbyshire in a game that was dominated by bad weather. Somerset, runners-up the previous season, collapsed from 96/2 at the end of the third day against Durham to 186 all out, in the process losing by 48 runs to the champions of 2008 and 2009. Middlesex defeated Nottinghamshire by ten wickets at Trent Bridge. This was the latter county's first loss in an opening fixture for eleven years. Yorkshire, the other team promoted from Division Two in 2012, also lost at home—they fell to an innings defeat against Sussex, having been bowled out for just 96 in their first innings. Middlesex and Sussex jointly led the table on 23 points after the first round of games, with only Surrey yet to play their first match.

Despite having a slight first-innings lead, Derbyshire lost within three days against Middlesex at Lord's, having been bowled out for just 60 in their second innings, their lowest total against Middlesex. Surrey's first game of the season ended as a draw against Somerset, in part as a result of play being lost due to rain. Durham suffered a change in fortunes, falling to a heavy defeat against Warwickshire, who bowled them out for 94 after setting a target of 413 to win. Nottinghamshire picked up their first win of the season against Derbyshire, who had yet to win themselves on their return to Division One. Surrey drew their second consecutive game at The Oval, this time against Sussex, on a pitch that appeared to favour batting. Durham fell to a second consecutive defeat when Yorkshire set a record for the highest successful chase at Chester-le-Street. Warwickshire's tenth-wicket partnership denied Somerset their first victory of the season, holding out for 78 minutes in a match that was somewhat overshadowed by a series of questionable umpiring decisions. Middlesex, with two wins out of two, remained at the top of the table at the end of April, eight points clear of Warwickshire.

Durham subjected Nottinghamshire to a second consecutive home defeat, chasing a target of 183 in just over twenty overs. Derbyshire's miserable season continued with an innings loss against Yorkshire in a match that appeared to be heading for a draw. The matches between Middlesex and Surrey, and Sussex and Warwickshire were both drawn, allowing Durham to take the lead in the standings, with four other teams—Middlesex, Yorkshire, Warwickshire and Sussex—within ten points of the lead. In a match heavily affected by bad weather, Somerset hung on for a draw against Yorkshire, finishing on 61/6 after being made to follow-on. The weather also intervened in the match between Warwickshire and Middlesex at Edgbaston, which ended in a high-scoring draw. Durham's third win in five games, this time against Surrey, extended their Championship lead to 13.5 points over nearest rivals Middlesex.

Yorkshire's impressive start to the season continued when they inflicted an innings defeat on defending champions Warwickshire, dismissing them for under 200 in both innings. Somerset fell to their first home Championship defeat since the end of 2011, losing to Middlesex by nine wickets in three days. Sussex condemned the struggling Derbyshire to their fourth straight loss, with more than two sessions to spare at Derby. Surrey's difficult season continued when they lost to Nottinghamshire by over a hundred runs in a fairly low-scoring match. Sussex completed an innings victory against Somerset within two days, bowling their opponents out for just 76 and 108 in the two innings. Championship contenders Durham and Middlesex drew at Chester-le-Street after rain curtailed play on the third day. Durham ended up four wickets short of securing another victory. The game between Somerset and Yorkshire at Taunton also resulted in a rain-affected draw. Nevertheless, Yorkshire led the table at the end of May, a single point ahead of Sussex, and a further point clear of Middlesex. Somerset, Surrey and Derbyshire, all yet to win a game, were early contenders for relegation.

The match between fellow strugglers Derbyshire and Surrey ended in a high-scoring draw, while Nottinghamshire fell four wickets short of defeating early title contenders Sussex. The 2010 champions drew a second game in a week in a high-scoring encounter against Yorkshire. Draws also resulted in the contests between Middlesex and Sussex, Surrey and Warwickshire, and Somerset and Durham. Yorkshire defeated Middlesex by ten wickets, their first win at Lord's for 26 years. On the same day, Durham completed a narrow victory over Warwickshire, placing them back in title contention. Sussex, while remaining unbeaten, could only manage a draw with Surrey. The contest between Nottinghamshire and Derbyshire also ended in a high-scoring draw. Somerset achieved their first win of the season away at fellow relegation candidates Derbyshire, while Surrey managed a fourth successive draw, this time against title contenders Yorkshire. A draw for Sussex against Nottinghamshire was enough to give them second place in the table, eight points behind Yorkshire, and 8.5 ahead of Durham, at the halfway stage of the season.

After a two-week break, Championship cricket returned on 8 July. Sussex beat Somerset for the second time in 2013, this time in just three days. Derbyshire's relegation worries were not abated when they lost by 279 runs to title contenders Durham, who bowled them out for under 200 in both innings. Middlesex's title ambitions were dented by a loss to Warwickshire on a turning pitch at Uxbridge, while an unbeaten century from Ricky Ponting in his final first-class innings was enough to save Surrey from a defeat against Nottinghamshire. A victory for Warwickshire against Nottinghamshire gave the defending champions a faint hope of being able to retain their title, while more realistic title hopefuls Yorkshire completed an innings defeat against Derbyshire, their seventh loss in ten games. Sussex's chances of claiming their first Championship for six years were damaged with their first loss of the season, at Hove against Middlesex. Yorkshire topped the table at the end of July, seven points clear of, and with a game in hand over, second-placed Sussex. Durham were third, 19.5 points behind Yorkshire, but with an extra game left to play.

Middlesex defeated fellow title challengers Durham within three days in a low-scoring match in which neither side posted a score above 200. Sussex lost their second consecutive Championship game, this time against relegation-battling Derbyshire, who took their first win of the season, and their first victory at Hove for seventeen years. The prevalence of heavy rain thwarted any hopes of a result in the matches between Somerset and Nottinghamshire, and Yorkshire and Warwickshire. Derbyshire's hopes of survival were boosted by a win against Middlesex, whose title ambitions were dented, while a draw for Warwickshire at home to Somerset left their hopes of retaining the Championship increasingly slim. Meanwhile, Yorkshire defeated Nottinghamshire to take their sixth victory of the season, strengthening their lead at the top of the table, while at Chester-le-Street, an emphatic victory for Durham over Surrey ensured that Yorkshire's position was not left unchallenged. Yorkshire, with four games remaining had 181 points, while Durham, with an additional game yet to play, were 25.5 points behind the leaders. In the relegation battle, two points separated seventh-placed Derbyshire and eighth-placed Somerset, while Surrey, albeit with a game in hand, were a further thirteen points back in last place.

Somerset's hopes of retaining their place in Division One were assisted by an innings victory over Middlesex at Lord's, with the erstwhile title contenders being bowled out for just 106 and 164 in their two innings. The match between Warwickshire and Sussex petered out into a draw when neither side could agree to set up a fourth-innings chase. The gap between the two leading sides was closed considerably when Durham defeated Yorkshire by seven wickets, in what was the first-placed county's first loss since their opening fixture of the season. Surrey's first win of the season, against relegation rivals Derbyshire, allowed them to move above their opponents in the table, while remaining adrift of both Somerset and Nottinghamshire. However, four days later, Surrey fell to their fourth defeat of the season, against Middlesex, in a match in which off-spinner Ollie Rayner took fifteen wickets. A comprehensive victory against Sussex within three days put Durham into the lead of the Championship, 14.5 points ahead of Yorkshire, with three games apiece to be played. At the other end of the table, Derbyshire won in a close-fought contest at Taunton, where having been nearly 200 behind after their first innings, Somerset recovered to post Derbyshire a target of 244, which was achieved with two wickets to spare. A washout on the final day of their game denied Nottinghamshire a chance to win against Warwickshire, leaving the 2010 champions on the cusp of the relegation battle. A rain-affected draw for Yorkshire against Sussex, while Durham completed a nine-wicket victory against Derbyshire (bowling them out for just 63 in the second innings), left Yorkshire trailing Durham by 27.5 points with two games each remaining. Meanwhile, in the relegation battle, a win for Somerset over Surrey, and a draw for Nottinghamshire against Middlesex, ensured that both Somerset and Nottinghamshire were clear of the relegation zone. Derbyshire and Surrey occupied the bottom two spots, with one and two games left, respectively.

Durham clinched the County Championship on 19 September by winning their match against Nottinghamshire by eight wickets, giving them an unassailable 48.5 point lead over Yorkshire, who, the following day, completed an 80 run victory against Middlesex to secure second place in the table. When Warwickshire defeated Surrey by six wickets at Edgbaston, the latter county's relegation to Division Two for 2014 was confirmed. The following week, the remaining relegation spot was taken by Derbyshire, who were also condemned to Division Two by losing a match to Warwickshire—on this occasion by an innings, after being bowled out for 103 and 120. With the prospect for relegation for both counties removed, Nottinghamshire and Somerset drew their match at Trent Bridge, while the game between Surrey and Yorkshire, whose fates had already been decided the previous week, ended as a high-scoring draw. Sussex won their final match, against champions-elect Durham, to clinch third in the standings, leaving Warwickshire and Middlesex in fourth and fifth, respectively, while Somerset and Nottinghamshire ended level on points, with the former taking sixth place, with three wins to the latter's two.

Division Two
The opening round of games, which included a contest between the two counties relegated from Division One (Lancashire and Worcestershire), ended with all four matches drawn. The following week, Northamptonshire subjected Essex to an innings defeat, bowling the visitors out for just 183 and 207, in a match that was completed within three days. Glamorgan defeated Worcestershire at Cardiff for the first time in 42 years, while the match between Leicestershire and Kent ended in a high-scoring draw. Worcestershire fell to a second successive defeat, this time against Hampshire, who completed an innings victory, their first win of the season, after rain thwarted their chances against Leicestershire in the first round of games. Northamptonshire took a maximum 24 points in their game against Gloucestershire after claiming a seven-wicket win, while the match between Lancashire and Kent at Old Trafford culminated in a rain-affected draw. At the end of April, Northamptonshire were the early leaders, having played three matches (in contrast to two for most other counties), with Hampshire twenty points behind in second (with a game in hand), while third-placed Glamorgan were eight points away from the promotion spots.

Essex took their first win of the season against the previously unbeaten Hampshire, chasing their target of 143 with four wickets to spare, after previously collapsing to 31/6. Gloucestershire also picked up their first win in the first week of May, in a low-scoring contest with Leicestershire, in which neither side reached 300 in a single innings. Northamptonshire took their third consecutive victory of the season when they defeated Kent, with their overseas signing Trent Copeland taking ten wickets in the match. Glamorgan, who were sixty runs away from victory against Lancashire, for the loss of just two wickets, suffered a dramatic collapse at Colwyn Bay, losing their last eight wickets for just 45 runs. This was Glamorgan's first loss of the season, and Lancashire's first win. A week later, Lancashire took a second win when they chased down the target of 253, set by Essex, within just 47 overs. There were draws in the matches between Gloucestershire and Hampshire, which saw the hosts resort to using four substitute fielders at one point, and Worcestershire and Leicestershire, in which a day's worth of play was lost due to rain. Worcestershire took their first win of the season against the struggling Kent, who were bowled out for just 63 in their second innings, with the result coming within two days. In a closely fought contest, Essex defeated Glamorgan at Cardiff by five wickets, while Northamptonshire's run of three consecutive victories came to an end when their match against Leicestershire ended in a draw. Glamorgan's hopes of victory at Grace Road, after making Leicestershire follow on, were eliminated when less than an hour's play was possible on day four of the match. Worcestershire took a second consecutive victory when they defeated Gloucestershire by ten wickets, while the match between Essex and Kent, in which the third day's play was lost to rain, was drawn. The best part of a day's worth of play was also lost in the contest between Hampshire and Lancashire, which consequently ended as another draw. Rain eliminated more than 200 overs in the match between Worcestershire and Essex; as a result, only two innings were possible, and the match was drawn. At the end of May, Northamptonshire, who were unbeaten after five matches, still led the table, while Worcestershire and Essex, who had played two more games each than their closest rivals, were second and third, respectively. Lancashire, also unbeaten, were the next highest-placed team to have played just five matches.

The remaining games begun before the end of May—the contests between Kent and Leicestershire, Northamptonshire and Hampshire, and Lancashire and Gloucestershire—were all curtailed at some point by poor weather, and all finished as draws. The following week, Northamptonshire strengthened their lead at the top of Division Two by winning against Worcestershire by ten wickets. There were relatively high-scoring draws in the matches between Gloucestershire and Glamorgan, and Hampshire and Kent. Rain severely curtailed the game between Leicestershire and Northamptonshire, which resulted in a draw despite the latter county's apparent advantage. After both captains agreed to forfeit an innings each, Gloucestershire defeated Hampshire by 198 runs in a match that would otherwise have likely ended as a draw. Lancashire continued their unbeaten run with an innings victory against Essex, who were bowled out for just 20 in their second innings, their own record lowest total, and the lowest total against Lancashire. Kent were able to salvage a draw against Glamorgan, despite a first innings deficit of 243 runs. In the final round of games in June, Lancashire won against their main rivals Northamptonshire inside two days, while Worcestershire defeated Glamorgan by eight wickets, Leicestershire, yet to win a Championship match in 2013, were beaten by Essex in a closely fought contest. At the end of June, Northamptonshire still led Division Two. Lancashire were 17 points adrift, although they had a game in hand over the leaders. Worcestershire and Essex, 16 and 17 points behind Lancashire, respectively, were also very much in contention for promotion. Kent and Leicestershire, neither of which had yet won a game, were at the bottom of the table.

After a short break, the County Championship returned to action in the second week of July. Hampshire's 41 run first innings lead against Glamorgan proved to be crucial, as they won the game by just 43 runs. Lancashire's victory against title rivals Northamptonshire at Northampton promoted the visitors to the top spot in the Division Two standings, ahead of their hosts for that game. Kent chased 411 in the fourth innings of their game against Gloucestershire to claim their first Championship victory of the season. However, a flat pitch in their match against Hampshire prevented any chance of a second consecutive win—the contest ended as a high-scoring draw. Despite a twelve-wicket match haul for Simon Kerrigan, division leaders Lancashire could also only manage a draw against Glamorgan. Leicestershire continued to struggle for Championship form, falling to an innings defeat against Essex. Worcestershire's chances of promotion were dented when Gloucestershire completed a six wicket victory over them. At the end of July all nine counties had completed ten games apiece, and Lancashire, the only unbeaten team in the division, led Northamptonshire by eight points, while Essex were a further eighteen points adrift in third. Leicestershire, the only winless team at this stage, were eighteen points behind their nearest rivals, Glamorgan.

In the first week of August, Leicestershire fell to another innings defeat, this time against top-of-the-division Lancashire. The remaining three fixtures of the week—the matches between Worcestershire and Kent, Hampshire and Glamorgan, and Northamptonshire and Gloucestershire—all culminated in rain-affected draws. Northamptonshire took a second consecutive draw two weeks later, in a game against Essex in which the third day's play was lost. Four months after their first Championship win of the season, Glamorgan claimed a second victory, an innings win against the struggling Leicestershire. The loss of the entire final day's play prevented a result in the match between Kent and Gloucestershire—had play been possible, the latter county would have required a further 92 runs with only one wicket in hand. A fifth win in six games, this time against Worcestershire, gave Lancashire a 34-point lead in the points standings. An innings victory inside three days against Glamorgan strengthened Northamptonshire's chances of achieving promotion to Division One. Lancashire maintained their healthy lead at the top of the table by defeating Hampshire by 122 runs at Southport, while Leicestershire fell to a fifth consecutive defeat, this time against Worcestershire, whose hopes of promotion were boosted by the result. Meanwhile, the match between Gloucestershire and Essex ended in a high-scoring draw. At the end of August, Lancashire held a 33-point lead over Northamptonshire. Essex and Worcestershire, who were 44 and 45 points, respectively, behind Northamptonshire, were still technically promotion contenders. Leicestershire's continuing poor form left them 27 points behind next-to-bottom Kent.

Leicestershire fell to yet another innings defeat in their game against mid-table Gloucestershire, the match being completed within three days. Victory for Essex against their rivals Worcestershire kept the former side in contention for promotion, while the latter county's chances were essentially eliminated by the result. Kent joined Glamorgan on two Championship wins by defeating the Welsh county inside three days at Cardiff. The match between Hampshire and Northamptonshire ended in a draw, although it could technically have been called off and restarted at another time, as a result of the absence of Hampshire's scorer on the final day, due to illness. Lancashire, who drew their match against Leicestershire, were assured of promotion when Essex failed to beat Kent. Worcestershire, resigned to remaining in Division Two in 2014, also drew in their game against Hampshire. Leicestershire lost their final match of the season against Hampshire without picking up a single bonus point; they failed to win a single Championship match all season for the first time in their history. Draws in the matches between Essex and Glamorgan, and Northamptonshire and Kent, left Northamptonshire as firm favourites for the second promotion spot, while Lancashire clinched the Division Two title after drawing their game against Gloucestershire. Although Northamptonshire were defeated by Worcestershire, they still secured promotion by virtue of the fact that Essex also lost in their match against Hampshire. Glamorgan ended their season with an eight-wicket win against Gloucestershire, while Division Two champions Lancashire fell to their first, and only, defeat of the season in their game against Kent, who were set 418 to win. Lancashire finished 36 points clear of Northamptonshire, whose advantage over third-placed Essex was 20 points. Hampshire, Worcestershire and Gloucestershire were split by just four points, while there were only two points between Kent and Glamorgan. Leicestershire ended 70 points behind eighth-placed Glamorgan.

Standings
 Pld = Played, W = Wins, L = Losses, D = Draws, T = Ties, A = Abandonments, Bat = Batting points, Bowl = Bowling points, Ded = Deducted points, Pts = Points.

Teams receive 16 points for a win and 3 for a draw. Bonus points (a maximum of 5 batting points and 3 bowling points) may be scored during the first 110 overs of each team's first innings.

Division One

Division Two

Results summary
The fixtures for 2013 were announced in November 2012.

Division One

Division Two

Results in full

Division One

April

May

June

July

August

September

Division Two

April

May

June

July

August

September

Statistics

Division One

Most runs

Most wickets

Division Two

Most runs

Most wickets

References

2013
County Championship
County Championship